Nicholas Monroe and Simon Stadler were the defending champions, but Stadler chose not to participate.
Monroe played alongside Johan Brunström and successfully defended the title, defeating Jérémy Chardy and Oliver Marach in the final, 4–6, 7–6(7–5), [10–7].

Seeds

Draw

Draw

External Links
 Main Draw

Swedish Open - Doubles
2014 Doubles